Stefania Mosca (1957–2009) was a Venezuelan writer.

Works published
Jorge Luis Borges: Utopia and Reality (1984)
Memory and Forgetting (1986)
Everyday people (1990)
The Last Supper (1991)
Banal (1993)
My little world (1996)
Booklet No. 69 (2001)
Motherhood (2004)
The ordeal of the times
Ferdinand The Circus (2006)

References

1957 births
2009 deaths
Venezuelan women writers
20th-century Venezuelan novelists
20th-century women writers
20th-century Venezuelan writers
Venezuelan women novelists